An Xiangyi (born 24 December 2006) is a Chinese figure skater. She is a two-time  (2020 and 2022) national champion.

Career

Early years
An was the 2019 Asian Open advanced novice champion. Due to the COVID-19 pandemic, all Chinese national competitions were canceled during the 2020–21 season, thus An could not partake in major competitions. During the 2021–22 season, several coronavirus outbreaks and COVID-19 protocols in China caused the 2021 National Figure Skating Grand Prix and China Figure Skating Club League Finals (全国花样滑冰具乐部联赛总决赛) to be held virtually. In the Club League Finals, An scored 174.08 total points (63.00 in the short program and 111.08 in the free skating) to win the title.

2022–2023 season: Junior international debut 
An made her Junior Grand Prix debut at the 2022 Solidarity Cup, after scoring first in national qualification events. She finished fifth at the event.

After contracting COVID-19 and having had a recurrence of injuries, An withdrew from the 2022 Chinese Figure Skating Junior Championships and the 2022 Chinese Figure Skating Club League Finals. However, she later competed in the 2022 Chinese Figure Skating Championships, ranking first in the short program by a small 1.73 mark lead after falling on her triple Toe-triple Toe combination, and winning the free skate by 15.83 marks, ahead of Li Ruotang.

In March, An was assigned to the 2023 World Junior Figure Championships in Calgary, where she ranked fifth in the short program. In the free skate, she stepped out of one jump and had quarter underrotation calls on three others, ranking eighth in that segment but finishing sixth overall. She became the first Chinese woman to place in the top ten since Li Zijun in 2012.

Programs

Competitive highlights 
JGP: ISU Junior Grand Prix

Detailed results

References

External links 
 

2006 births
Living people
Chinese female single skaters
Figure skaters from Beijing
Chinese rhythmic gymnasts
Gymnasts from Beijing
21st-century Chinese women